Microhyrax was a prehistoric genus of herbivorous hyrax-grouped mammal. It lived during the Eocene period from 55.8 to 40.4 million years ago in modern-day Algeria.

Cladogram
A phylogeny of hyracoids known from the early Eocene through the middle Oligocene epoch.

References

Prehistoric hyraxes
Fossil taxa described in 1979
Prehistoric placental genera